The Desert Hockey Classic is an annual mid season ice hockey tournament hosted by Arizona State University. Michigan Tech won the inaugural tournament in 2015. In 2016–2017 the Desert Hockey Classic was moved to Prescott, and later returned to Glendale for the 2018–19 season. The tournament went on hiatus for the 2017–18 and 2019–20 seasons.

Championship game

Team records

References

College ice hockey tournaments in the United States
Annual sporting events in the United States
Recurring sporting events established in 2015
Sports in Glendale, Arizona
Events in Glendale, Arizona
Sports competitions in Maricopa County, Arizona